Jimilang Tsho (also known as Sand Ox Lake) is a natural lake in Thimphu District of Bhutan.

Geography
This lake is situated at an altitude of 3870 m from sea level.

Etmyology
Jimilang Tsho (Sand Ox Lake) takes its name from a legend about a bull that rose up out of the lake and joined the cows of a family utilizing the territory as a summer grazing ground.

Aquafauna
Jimilang Tsho is additionally known for its giant trouts, which were introduced during the 1970s.

References

Lakes of Bhutan
Thimphu District